Trespass is the second studio album by the English rock band Genesis. It was released in October 1970 on Charisma Records, and is their last album with original guitarist Anthony Phillips and their only one with drummer John Mayhew.

Genesis turned professional in autumn 1969, and began to rehearse intensely and play live shows. After several months of touring they secured a recording contract with Charisma Records, and entered Trident Studios in London in June 1970 to record Trespass. The music marked a departure from more pop-oriented songs, as displayed on their first album From Genesis to Revelation, towards folk-flavoured progressive rock. This ranged from light acoustic pieces with multiple twelve-string guitars such as "Dusk", to the heavier live favorite "The Knife". The sleeve, featuring a knife slash across the front, was the first of several to be designed by Paul Whitehead.

Shortly after recording, Phillips decided to leave the group, which almost caused Genesis to split. After discussing the situation, they agreed to continue, and replaced Mayhew with drummer and singer Phil Collins. Trespass was not a major success upon release; it failed to chart in the UK and the US and it received some mixed reviews from critics, but it was commercially successful in Belgium, which helped sustain the band's career. A reissue briefly charted the UK top 100 in 1984.

Background and recording 
In August 1969, Genesis decided to become a professional band. The founders – guitarist Anthony Phillips, bassist Mike Rutherford, vocalist and flautist Peter Gabriel, and keyboardist Tony Banks – had been joined by drummer John Silver. They split from producer Jonathan King and decided to write more complex material than the straightforward pop on their first album From Genesis to Revelation. Gabriel recalled that the group wanted to explore and mix musical styles. The group bought new equipment, including a bass guitar and a Hammond organ, and recorded songs at Regent Studios for a demo, including "White Mountain" and "Family" (which became "Dusk"). Silver then left to study in the US.

In September, Genesis played their first live shows as a professional band, touring the local club and university circuit, with new drummer John Mayhew. Mayhew, the oldest and most experienced musician, came from a different background to the rest of the band. Phillips recalled that, despite their efforts to make him feel comfortable, the drummer was unsure of his playing. In early 1970, they secured a six-week residency at Ronnie Scott's jazz club in Soho, London, during which they were spotted by Charisma Records producer John Anthony. He persuaded label boss Tony Stratton-Smith to sign them. The group wanted to branch out from their earlier pop-oriented style, and write and perform songs that were unlike any other band at the time. Rutherford later said that gigging was "tough, but a good way of getting the music into shape". Two songs that made it to the next album, "Looking for Someone" and "Stagnation", were recorded for a BBC session in February 1970.

In June 1970, they retreated to Trident Studios in London to record a new album. Anthony joined them as their producer and engineer, and the songs were recorded on 16-track tape. Phillips remembered that recording was only "slightly more sophisticated" than on From Genesis to Revelation, and thought Anthony disliked having someone "drop in" individual parts. He remembered a session in which Rutherford had to listen to several minutes of the track before putting down a guitar part; by which time he had become too nervous and played it incorrectly. The group had enough material to record two albums, but felt some songs were not strong enough. They selected the strongest material for Trespass. They worked well with Anthony, and later recalled that his contributions were important and helped shape the album.

Songs
The songs on the album originated from one or two members bringing along ideas to develop, or the group working out an arrangement as a whole. Banks later said that "we had played live quite a bit and every song on the album had been performed on stage. We had a selection of at least twice as many songs as appeared on the album, and the versions changed rapidly." Rutherford complained that the songs had already been composed and arranged in advance, and there was little opportunity to change their sound, arrangement or direction in the studio. The band drew from Gabriel's soul influences, along with classical, pop and folk music, and made regular use of Phillips and Rutherford's twelve-string guitar playing. Gabriel was particularly fond of the combined twelve-string guitars and thought they gave the group a more unique and innovative sound. The group's songwriting during this period often originated in pairs, with Phillips and Rutherford, and Banks and Gabriel, developing songs separately and presenting them to the group for further development.

The album opens with "Looking for Someone", beginning with Gabriel's vocal accompanied only by an organ, later described as being "idiosyncratic enough to set them apart from the herd within seconds". He came up with the song which was then extended and developed by the group, starting with soul influences which move towards folk as it progresses. The coda at the end of the song was written by the group as a whole. Paul Stump wrote in 1997 that there is "the barefaced presence of a riff" from "I Am the Walrus" by the Beatles in the song.

"White Mountain" and "Dusk" had been worked out by Phillips and Rutherford before deciding to record the album. The whole group worked on the music for "Stagnation", originally called "Movement", that Gabriel added lyrics to. "Visions of Angels" was recorded for the previous album From Genesis to Revelation, but not used – the band did not think any takes of it were good enough – so it was re-recorded for Trespass. It originated from 1968 a piano piece by Phillips at a time when his piano technique was limited, but could produce a "plodding" style similar to songs by the Beach Boys and the Beatles. It has a more straightforward verse/chorus structure than some of the other songs. "Stagnation" and "Dusk" showed Phillips and Rutherford's combined twelve-string sound, along with Banks taking a lead on piano, organ and Mellotron. This subsequently became a trademark of early Genesis. Rutherford later recalled there were around ten acoustic guitars on part of "Stagnation", but they cancelled each other out in the final mix. Gabriel described the track as a "journey song" with its lack of a more typical verse/chorus structure and the variety of mood changes it presents. At one point during its development the song was around 13 minutes long before sections were removed or altered, but the introduction remained unchanged.

"The Knife" was written by Gabriel and Banks. It was originally titled "The Nice" as a tribute to the Nice, and the organ part on the track was styled to resemble the playing of Nice keyboardist Keith Emerson. As fans of that group, Genesis were inspired to put together a heavier rock song which Gabriel said was "something more dangerous" compared to their delicate acoustic numbers. He added: "It was the first peak of a darker energy that we discovered". It lasted up to 19 minutes in concert, but was reduced to eight for the album. Gabriel wrote the lyrics as a parody of a protest song. The song's interlude, in which a group of soldiers fire on a crowd of protesters, was inspired by the Kent State shootings from the previous spring.

Phillips later recalled that the songs "Everywhere is Here", "Grandma", "Little Leaf", "Going out to Get You", "Shepherd", "Moss", "Let Us Now Make Love" and "Pacidy" were not developed further in the studio. Banks said that "Going out to Get You" was too long to fit on the album as well as "The Knife", and the latter song had to have a portion of it cut out to fit on the LP.

Artwork 
The album cover was painted by Paul Whitehead and features an engraving by Hungarian illustrator Willy Pogany. Whitehead also did the covers for the band's next two albums. The cover showed two people looking out of a window at mountains, which represented the pastoral themes of some of the songs. Whitehead had finished the cover and then the band added "The Knife" to the running order. Feeling that the cover no longer fitted the mood of the album, they asked Whitehead to re-design it; when he was reluctant to do so, the band members inspired him to slash the canvas with an actual knife.

Whitehead's original illustrations for the three albums were stolen from the Charisma archives when it was sold to Virgin Records in 1983. Whitehead claimed that Charisma staff got wind of the imminent sale and proceeded to loot its office.

Release 
Trespass was first released in the UK on the Charisma label in October 1970. In the US, it was first issued on ABC's jazz label, Impulse!. "The Knife" was released as single (split into two parts) in May 1971, but did not chart.

The album was reissued by the main ABC Records label in 1974; then, after MCA Records bought out ABC, it was reissued on the MCA label. A SACD/DVD double disc set (including new 5.1 and Stereo mixes) was released in 2008.

Critical reception 

Trespass sold 6,000 copies on its original release and helped the band build up a live following. "The Knife" was released as a single in January 1971.

The album had a mixed reception by the music press at the time of its release. Jerry Gilbert, writing in Sounds, gave a positive review and singled out "Visions of Angels" and "White Mountain". A review in Melody Maker said the album was "tasteful, subtle and refined". Rolling Stone printed an extremely brief but unambiguously negative review of the 1974 reissue, saying "It's spotty, poorly defined, at times innately boring, and should be avoided by all but the most rabid Genesis fans." AllMusic's later retrospective review was only slightly more forgiving, summarising that the album "is more interesting for what it points toward than what it actually does". They also commented that the guitars are so low in the mix that they are almost inaudible, leaving Banks's keyboard instruments far more prominent. They considered this troublesome because Banks having a noticeable role "isn't the Genesis that everyone came to know".

Aftermath

Despite describing the recording sessions as "pleasant" and not considerably difficult, Phillips had become uncomfortable with the band's musical direction, and was unhappy about the number of gigs, which took away time to write complex material such as "Stagnation". He also thought there were too many songwriters in the group and it was difficult to get ideas across. Shortly afterwards, matters came to a head and he quit the group. Rutherford later recalled that Phillips looked unwell during the recording sessions, and he worried that Phillips's departure might mean the end of Genesis. After the group drove back from the last gig in Hayward's Heath to Gabriel's house in Chobham, they decided they would carry on.

In the liner notes to the Genesis box set Genesis Archive 1967–75, Banks claims "Let Us Now Make Love", one of Phillips's songs, was not recorded for the album because the group thought it had the potential of a single, but following the guitarist's sudden departure following the album's completion, it was never recorded in the studio. A live version was released on the box set, performed in February 1970.

At the same time, the group decided to replace Mayhew with a more suitable drummer. He was older than the rest of the band and considered an outsider, not contributing much to writing and lacking confidence. An urgent replacement was required to fulfil live dates to promote Trespass. Phil Collins auditioned and joined in August, and the album was released in October. The group could not find a suitable replacement for Phillips, so they resumed gigging as a four-piece. In late 1970, they appeared on the television show Disco 2 to promote the album with Phillips' replacement, Mick Barnard. The group mimed with Gabriel singing live, who recalled the performance was "disastrous". The group auditioned Steve Hackett as a replacement in December and he officially joined the band the following month.

Track listing 
All songs credited to Anthony Phillips, Mike Rutherford, Peter Gabriel, and Tony Banks. Actual songwriters listed below.

Personnel 
Genesis
Peter Gabriel – lead vocals, flute, accordion, tambourine, bass drum
Anthony Phillips – acoustic 12-string guitar, lead electric guitar, dulcimer, vocals
Tony Banks – Hammond organ, piano, Mellotron, acoustic 12-string guitar, vocals
Mike Rutherford – acoustic 12-string guitar, electric bass guitar, nylon guitar, cello, vocals
John Mayhew – drums, percussion, vocals

Production
John Anthony – producer
Robin Geoffrey Cable – engineer
Paul Whitehead – layout
Nick Davis – mixing (2008 release)
Tony Cousins – mastering (2008 release)

References 
Citations

Sources

 

 

1970 albums
Genesis (band) albums
Virgin Records albums
MCA Records albums
Impulse! Records albums
Charisma Records albums
Geffen Records albums
ABC Records albums
Albums produced by John Anthony (record producer)
Albums recorded at Trident Studios